Murro is a surname. Notable people with the surname include:

 Murro, mononym of Danish singer
 Christian Murro (born 1978), Italian cyclist
 John de Murro, a.k.a. Giovanni Mincio da Morrovalle, Italian Franciscan
 Mark Murro (born 1949), American javelin thrower
 Moshe Murro, Israeli artist
 Noam Murro, director of the films Smart People, Hateship, Friendship, Courtship, Loveship, Marriage and 300: Rise of an Empire
 Tom Murro, American journalist TV personality

See also

 Murro the Marauder, a villain in Birdman and the Galaxy Trio
 Murro, a survivor in the video game Identity V
 a Portuguese manner of cooking potatoes for the bacalhau dish